Euxoa basalis is a moth of the family Noctuidae. It is found in Alberta, Saskatchewan and the Northern Territories in Canada, south to Colorado, Arizona and California. It is abundant in the Rocky Mountain region.

The wingspan is about 35mm.

External links
Biosystematics of the genus euxoa (lepidoptera: noctuidae): II. A description of the immature stages of euxoa basalis and a redescription of the adult

Euxoa
Moths of North America
Moths described in 1879